This is a list of diplomatic missions of Papua New Guinea, excluding honorary consulates.

Americas

 Washington, D.C. (Embassy)

Asia

 Beijing (Embassy)

 New Delhi (High Commission)

 Jakarta (Embassy)
 Jayapura (Consulate-General)

 Tokyo (Embassy)

 Kuala Lumpur (High Commission)

 Manila (Embassy)

 Singapore (High Commission)

 Seoul (Embassy)

 Taipei (Papua New Guinea Trade Office in Taiwan)

Europe

 Brussels (Embassy)

 London (High Commission)

Oceania

 Canberra (High Commission)
 Brisbane (Consulate-General)
 Sydney (Consulate-General)
 Cairns (Consulate)

 Suva (High Commission)

 Wellington (High Commission)

 Honiara (High Commission)

Multilateral Organisations
 
Brussels (Permanent mission)
 
New York City (Permanent mission)

Gallery

See also
 Foreign relations of Papua New Guinea

References
 Diplomatic missions of Papua New Guinea
 High Commission of Papua New Guinea in Canberra, Australia
 High Commission of Papua New Guinea in London, United Kingdom
 Embassy of Papua New Guinea in Washington DC, USA

 
Papua New Guinea
Diplomatic missions